Derek Magyar is an American actor. He is best known as the director and producer of the film Flying Lessons, as the lead character "X" in the film Boy Culture, and as Commander Kelby during the fourth season of Star Trek: Enterprise.

He graduated from the California Institute of the Arts in 2003 and has appeared in several TV shows and films. In 2005, he was cast in the role of Commander Kelby, the newly promoted Chief engineer of the starship Enterprise in the TV series Star Trek Enterprise. In 2006 he had his first starring role as "X" in the LGBT film Boy Culture opposite Patrick Bauchau, Darryl Stephens, and Jonathan Trent.  In 2018, it was announced he would be reprising this role in a sequel, “Boy Culture: The Series.”

Filmography

References

External links
 
 
 
 Flying Lessons Website

Living people
Year of birth missing (living people)
American male actors
California Institute of the Arts alumni